R64 may refer to:
 R64 (South Africa), a road
 , a destroyer of the Royal Canadian Navy
 , an aircraft carrier of the Royal Navy
 R64: May cause harm to breast-fed babies, a risk phrase in chemistry
 Small nucleolar RNA R64/Z200 family